Raskolnikov (masculine) or Raskolnikova (feminine) is a Russian surname derived from the religious term raskolnik. Alternative spellings include Raskolnikow and Raskolnikoff.
Fyodor Raskolnikov, pseudonym of Fyodor Ilyin, Russian sailor, Bolshevik and diplomat
Jonas Raskolnikov Christiansen, founder of the Norwegian black metal band Slavia
Ripoff Raskolnikoff, singer
Rodion Romanovich Raskolnikov, the fictional protagonist of the novel Crime and Punishment by Fyodor Dostoyevsky

Russian-language surnames